Kanembu may refer to:

Kanembu people
Kanembu language